Christian Federico von Wernich (born 27 May 1938 in Concordia, Entre Ríos Province) is an Argentine Roman Catholic priest and a former chaplain of the Buenos Aires Province Police while it was under the command of General Ramón Camps, during the dictatorial period known as the National Reorganization Process (El proceso) (1976–1983). Wernich worked in Miguel Etchecolatz's Direction of Investigations of the provincial police with the rank of Inspector. He became internationally known in 2006 after being indicted for murder and kidnapping in aid of the military junta; he was convicted at trial in October 2007 and sentenced to life imprisonment.

Early life and education
Christian Federico von Wernich was born in 1938 into an ethnic German Catholic family. He attended parochial school and seminary. He was ordained as a Catholic priest in 1960.

Career
He became a chaplain of the Buenos Aires Province Police in the 1970s. The force was commanded by General Ramón Camps. This was during the military dictatorship known as National Reorganization Process (El proceso) (1976–1983), when the military and security forces took extreme actions to suppress political dissent in the country. The period became known as the Dirty War, and the government was later held responsible for tens of thousands of forced disappearances, kidnappings, torture, and deaths of political prisoners, in addition to widespread attacks of rural insurgents, which was later assessed as genocide. Going beyond acting as a spiritual adviser to police and suspects, Wernich worked with the rank of Inspector in Miguel Etchecolatz's Direction of Investigations of the provincial police.

Two years after the return of democracy in 1983, the government began to prosecute crimes under the dictatorship, in what was known as the Trial of the Juntas in 1985. Wernich was among those accused of participation in the Dirty War, and collaborating in the torture of political prisoners. He declared that he was innocent. Action against those involved in the military dictatorship was discontinued after Congress passed the 1986 Ley de Punto Final, intended to "draw a line" under all that had happened until then.

The country struggled to restore democratic institutions and rule of law. In 1991, President Carlos Saúl Menem pardoned Ramón Camps and other high-ranking leaders who had been convicted in the 1985 trial, setting off waves of protest. In 2003 Congress repealed the 1986 Ley de Punto Final. (In a court challenge, the Argentine Supreme Court ruled in 2005 that the law was unconstitutional.)

In 2003 the government re-opened prosecution of cases of crimes against humanity committed during the Dirty War. La Plata Federal Judge Arnaldo Corazza gathered testimony from witnesses who placed von Wernich at three illegal detention centers (Puesto Vasco, Coti Martínez and Pozo de Quilmes). He ordered the priest's arrest on 25 September 2003, after Wernich was discovered hiding in the Chilean seaside town of El Quisco under the assumed name of "Christian González". He was working as a priest, having returned to Argentina after earlier escaping to Chile.

On 7 March 2006, the Federal Court of La Plata confirmed the indictment and detention of Wernich on charges of co-authorship of homicide, illegal restraints, and acts of torture (including that used against the kidnapped Jacobo Timerman, the editor of La Opinión). Surviving victims declared that Wernich had questioned them under torture, subjected them to mock executions, and, under the guise of counseling, urged them to confess. Some of his accusers alleged Wernich violated the sacraments of the church by breaking the seal of the confessional, a charge he has denied.

Wernich's trial began on 5 July 2007 in La Plata, the capital of the province of Buenos Aires. He was accused of seven homicides and 41 instances of kidnapping and torture. The tribunal was composed of judges Carlos Rozanski, Norberto Lorenzo and Horacio Insaurralde, the same panel which had convicted and sentenced Miguel Etchecolatz in 2006. Before the trial, Wernich denied all charges, saying that while he did visit detention centers, he did not witness any human rights abuses there; however, on the first day of the trial, he exercised his right to silence.
 His accusers thought this was a sign that he did not want to practice self-incrimination by having to account for his crimes.

On 9 October 2007 the court found him guilty of complicity in seven homicides, 42 kidnappings, and 32 instances of torture. The tribunal sentenced him to life imprisonment.

Wernich's trial was thought to have revealed "the church's dark past during the dirty war, when it sometimes gave its support to the military's persecution of leftist opponents. That past stands in stark contrast to the role the church played during the dictatorships in Chile and Brazil, where priests and bishops publicly condemned the governments and worked to save those being persecuted from torture and death." During the trial, the Church was officially silent, although the Reverend Rubén Capitanio was called as a witness and was required to testify during the trial. He condemned the Roman Catholic Church's "complicity" in atrocities during the Dirty War. He said, "There are some that think that this trial is an attack on the church, and I want to say that this is a service to the church. This is helping us search for the truth."

On Wernich's conviction, his superior, Bishop Martín Elizalde, apologised for Wernich being "so far from the requirements of the mission commended to him." When in 2010 it was reported that Wernich was still being permitted to officiate as a priest at Mass in prison, the bishop said that "at the appropriate time von Wernich's situation will have to be resolved in accordance with canonical law."

See also
 Dirty War
 Forced disappearance
 Religion in Argentina
 Miguel Etchecolatz
 Pope Francis

References

External links
 Information on von Wernich's trial provided by APDH La Plata
 A site supporting von Wernich as "a prisoner of war and  political prisoner" 
  

1938 births
Living people
Argentine people of German descent
Operatives of the Dirty War
20th-century Argentine Roman Catholic priests
Argentine prisoners sentenced to life imprisonment
Prisoners sentenced to life imprisonment by Argentina
Place of birth missing (living people)
Members of the clergy convicted of murder
Catholic priests convicted of murder
21st-century Argentine Roman Catholic priests
Police misconduct in Argentina
People convicted of kidnapping